Ribston Hall High School is a selective grammar school with academy status in Gloucester, England, for girls between the ages of 11 and 18. It was founded in 1921.

Admissions
It also has a sixth form for both girls and boys. It is situated south of Gloucester city centre on Stroud Road (B4072), between Linden and Tredworth, a few hundred metres west of the Cross Country Route.

History
It was known as High School for Girls, Ribston Hall. It became a grant maintained school in April 1990.
In 1886 Ribston Hall was known as The Ladies' College.

Houses
Students are divided into four houses: 
Britons, 
Danes, 
Saxons,
Romans.

Notable former pupils
 Christina Baily, actress as Dannii Carbone in Hollyoaks
 Mary-Jess Leaverland, won the 2010 Chinese Jiangsu province equivalent of The X Factor.
 Joanna Parrish, murdered in May 1990 in Auxerre, Burgundy whilst studying French at the University of Leeds
 Beth Rodford, GB Olympic rower
 Daphne Skillern QPM, female police Commander at Scotland Yard
 Nathan Sykes, member of boy band The Wanted and singer songwriter solo artist,

References

External links
 Ribston Hall High School

Grammar schools in Gloucestershire
Girls' schools in Gloucestershire
Schools in Gloucester
Academies in Gloucestershire
1921 establishments in England
Educational institutions established in 1921